Electric Funk is an album by the American jazz organist Jimmy McGriff of performances recorded in 1969 and released on the Blue Note label.

Reception

The Allmusic review by Stephen Thomas Erlewine awarded the album 3 out of 5 stars and said, "It's not jazz, it's jazzy soul, and it's among the funkiest of any soul-jazz records from the late '60s, filled with stuttering drum breaks, lite fuzz guitars, elastic bass, smoldering organ, and punchy, slightly incongruous horn charts."  On All About Jazz Douglas Payne stated "No sap, no frills. Just good true groove. ... in 1969, this was the next step for soul jazz; a genre Jimmy McGriff has always ruled. ... this man has always known how to rock a groove ... Ott's arrangements are riff-oriented and stay out of McGriff's way. They often launch McGriff into one clever line after another and, fortunately, never tempt him to out-modulate the horn section".

Track listing
All compositions by Jimmy McGriff except where noted
 "Back on the Track" (Horace Ott) – 3:18 
 "Chris Cross" (Ott) – 3:46 
 "Miss Poopie" (Ott) – 3:18 
 "The Bird Wave" – 4:01 
 "Spear for Moondog Part 1" – 3:29 
 "Spear for Moondog Part 2" – 3:04 
 "Tight Times" (Ott) – 3:58 
 "Spinning Wheel" (David Clayton-Thomas) – 3:34 
 "Funky Junk" (Ott) – 3:45

Personnel 
 Jimmy McGriff – electronic organ
 Blue Mitchell – trumpet
 Stanley Turrentine – tenor saxophone
 Horace Ott – electric piano, arranger
 Unknown – guitar 
 Chuck Rainey – electric bass 
 Bernard Purdie – drums

External link 
 Jimmy McGriff - Electric Funk auf YouTube

References

Blue Note Records albums
Jimmy McGriff albums
1970 albums
Albums arranged by Horace Ott
Albums produced by Sonny Lester